Joyce Judith Wadler (born January 2, 1948) is a journalist and reporter for The New York Times, as well as a writer and humorist.

Career
Prior to working at the New York Times, she was a reporter and feature writer for the New York Post, New York correspondent for The Washington Post and a contributing editor for New York Magazine and Rolling Stone. She authored Liaison: The True Story of the M. Butterfly Affair after interviewing Bernard Boursicot, who granted her wide access to information and insight into his affair with Shi Pei Pu.

Cancer
Wadler has been treated for both breast and ovarian cancer. In 1991, Wadler was diagnosed with breast cancer and had a malignant tumor "the size of a robin's egg" removed from her left breast. The eventual diagnosis was "ductal carcinoma with medullary features". Due to somewhat early detection and aggressive treatment, Wadler called it "[m]y maybe-not- the-best-but-still-pretty-terrific-whatever-the-hell-it-is cancer".

Her memoir about breast cancer, My Breast: One Woman's Cancer Story was originally a two-part cover story for New York Magazine and later expanded into an award-winning book and made into a television movie starring Meredith Baxter, which won the American Women in Radio and Television Excellence in Programming Award in 1995.  In 1995, she was diagnosed with "advanced ovarian cancer" and treated. She has been in remission since 2000.

Personal life
She is Jewish.

As stated in her Muck Rack profile she doesn't write as much as she used to, but money could still motivate her.

Works
 Books
 My Breast: One Woman’s Cancer Story
 Liaison: The True Story of the M. Butterfly Affair

References

External links
 "The Public Life of Joyce Wadler", New York Observer
Index of Wadler's recent reporting for The New York Times
 Joyce Wadler's blog
 

1948 births
Living people
American memoirists
American non-fiction writers
American reporters and correspondents
Jewish American writers
Writers from New York City
The New York Times writers
American women memoirists
American women journalists
Jewish women writers
21st-century American Jews
21st-century American women